Allen Wood may refer to:

 Allen K. Wood (1898–1977), American assistant director and production manager
 Allen W. Wood (born 1942), American philosopher
 Allen Wood (footballer) (1941–2018), Welsh footballer

See also
Allenwood (disambiguation)
Allan Wood (1943–2022), Australian freestyle swimmer
Alan Wood (disambiguation)